Brian Henderson (born November 22, 1986) is a professional French ice hockey player who participated at the 2010 IIHF World Championship as a member of the France National men's ice hockey team.

International
Henderson was placed to the France men's national ice hockey team for competition at the 2014 IIHF World Championship.

References

External links

Living people
French ice hockey forwards
1986 births
Sportspeople from Amiens